José Carlos Vilhena da Silva (born 16 April 1989), also known as José Silva, is a Portuguese professional basketball player for Benfica of the Liga Portuguesa de Basquetebol.

He has been a member of the Portugal national team and participated at the 2015 EuroBasket qualification, where he hit most three point shots for his team.

References

External links
RealGM Profile
Eurobasket.com Profile

1989 births
Living people
FC Porto basketball players
Sportspeople from Barreiro, Portugal
Portuguese men's basketball players
S.L. Benfica basketball players
Shooting guards
Small forwards